Vaslui may refer to the following places in Romania: 

Vaslui, a city in eastern Romania 
Vaslui County, an administrative division in eastern Romania
Vaslui (river), a river in Iași and Vaslui Counties
Vaslui (Oltișor), a small river in Olt County